Clematis smilacifolia is a species of flowering plant in the buttercup family Ranunculaceae. It usually grows on the margins of woodland areas and is native to tropical and subtropical Asia.

References 

smilacifolia
Flora of tropical Asia